The 1st Biathlon European Championships were held in Kontiolahti, Finland. Six competitions were held for athletes U26: sprint, individual and relays.

Results

U26

Men's

Women's

Medal table

References

External links 
 IBU full results

Biathlon European Championships
International sports competitions hosted by France
1995 in biathlon
1995 in French sport
Biathlon competitions in France